was the eldest son of Prince Fushimi Hiroyasu, and heir-apparent due to inherit the position of 24th head of the Fushimi-no-miya shinnōke (collateral branch of the Imperial Family of Japan), and a career officer in the Imperial Japanese Navy.

Early life 
Prince Fushimi Hiroyoshi was the eldest son and heir of Admiral of the Fleet Prince Fushimi Hiroyasu and his wife, the former Tokugawa Tsuneko. He graduated from the 45th class of the Imperial Japanese Naval Academy in 1917, ranked first in a class of 89 cadets. His classmates included Kosaku Ariga, final captain of the battleship Yamato.

Military career 
Prince Fushimi served his midshipman tour on the cruiser Iwate, and as a sub-lieutenant on the battleships Fusō and Kawachi. After completing coursework in naval artillery and torpedo warfare, he served as a crewman on Kongō, Hyūga, Kirishima and Hiei. After completing advanced training in torpedo warfare, he was assigned as Chief Torpedo officer on the destroyers Shimakaze, Numakaze, and cruisers Izumo and Naka. On 10th December 1928, he received his first command, the destroyer Kaba. He was subsequently captain of the destroyers Yomogi, Kamikaze, and Amagiri.

In 1933, the Prince was promoted to commander and became executive officer on the cruiser Naka, followed by the minelayer Itsukushima.

In 1936, Prince Fushimi became commander of the 3rd Destroyer Group, which was involved in combat in the Battle of Shanghai between Japanese and Chinese Nationalist forces during the opening stages of the Second Sino-Japanese War. On 25th September 1937, he was slightly injured in the Huangpu River during a bombardment operation. After recovery, he served as commander of the 6th Destroyer Group, assigned to patrols in the Yangtze River of China.

In April 1938, he was assigned back to Japan, where he became the instructor of a Naval War College.

On 19th October 1938, Prince Fushimi, who suffered from chronic asthma, died of myocardial infarction. It is said that the cause of his death was an unsuitable medicine which was injected by his doctor. His military rank was posthumously raised to captain.

Marriage and family 
On 23rd December 1919, Prince Fushimi married , the third daughter of Prince Saneteru Ichijō, by whom he had four children:

Gallery

Ancestry

References 

 Fujitani,T. Splendid Monarchy: Power and Pageantry in Modern Japan. University of California Press; Reprint edition (1998). 
 Lebra, Sugiyama Takie. Above the Clouds: Status Culture of the Modern Japanese Nobility. University of California Press (1995). 
 Nishida, Imperial Japanese Navy

Japanese princes
Heirs apparent who never acceded
Fushimi-no-miya
1897 births
1938 deaths
People from Tokyo
Japanese military personnel of World War II
Imperial Japanese Navy officers